The 2020 BCL Americas Final was the final game of the 2019–20 BCL Americas, the 1st season of the league under its new entity and the 13rd of the pan-American premier basketball league organised by FIBA. It was played at the Antel Arena in Montevideo on 30 October 2020. The game was played between Argentine club Quimsa and Brazilian club Flamengo.

Quimsa won the final 92–86 and captured its first pan-American championship, thus also qualifying for the 2021 FIBA Intercontinental Cup.

Teams
In the following table, finals until 2020 were in the FIBA Americas League era.

Road to the final

(H): Home game
(A): Away game

Game details

Notes

References

External links

2020 Final
2019–20 in South American basketball